Bat Doeng is a town in central Cambodia.

Transport 

It is served by a station on the national railway network.

Bat Doeng is the proposed site for the junction of a new railway connecting Cambodia with Vietnam at Lộc Ninh.

See also 

 Transport in Cambodia

References 

Towns in Cambodia